Blackdown is a small village in western Dorset, England; situated  west of Beaminster. With the creation of the new Dorset Council, Blackdown is now part of the new Marshwood Vale Ward. The main road through the village is the B3165, connecting Blackdown and Lyme Regis. The village has a population of 128 according to the 2001 Census. The village and surrounding area makes up the Blackdown ward of the Broadwindsor Group Parish Council which besides the few houses in Blackdown includes Kittwhistle, Templeman's Ash (part),  Laymore (part), Coles Cross, Causeway Lane, Venn, Southcoombe, Stoney Knapp, Schoolhouse Lane, Speckets Lane, Racedown, Cockpit, Horn Ash, Berechapel, two houses in Synderford, some houses in Birdsmoregate including the old Rose & Crown Public House now a private residence. The area is split between many postcodes partly due to the County boundary being realigned in the 1960s. Residents have postcodes with the main town as either Beaminster, Bridport, Crewkerne or Chard. Divisions also arise within telephone exchange areas (01308,01460 or 01297), the BT phone box was removed from the centre of Blackdown in March 2017. Water services are provided by either South West Water or Wessex Water.

Despite being part of Broadwindsor parish, Blackdown comes under the catchment area of Marshwood Primary School, three miles away, with secondary education being provided at Woodroffe School, ten miles away. Village children are entitled to free transport. The village school, situated next to the Church and now a private house, had been forced to close because of dwindling numbers, although it was reopened in World War Two to accommodate evacuees but later closed shortly after.

The Chapel of Ease dedicated to the Holy Trinity was erected in 1840 on the site of a former chapel building which had become derelict although there are a few graves which are prior to 1840.  On the night of 16/17 December 1961 the chapel was destroyed by a fire due to a wood-burning stove which had been lit overnight for a service the next day. The church is in the ecclesiastical parish of Blackdown (Beaminster Team) and often combines with Burstock and Broadwindsor Churches to raise funds for their shared precept. The present building was rebuilt and rededicated in 1964; since then full church status has been acquired, and the church community look forward to holding their first marriage service in the church.  One notable resident in the graveyard is John Anthony Brown, who was killed by his wife Elizabeth Martha Brown at Birdsmoregate, a small village a few miles away in 1856. Despite a plea for clemency, Elizabeth was publicly hanged at Dorchester Prison, a sight witnessed by many, including a 16-year-old Thomas Hardy, who years later asked Lady Hester Pinney who lived at Racedown House to investigate the story. It is believed that Hardy may have based his novel Tess of the d'Urbervilles on his experience.

Another branch of the Pinney family also lived at Blackdown House, and like Racedown House, they were formerly working farms. They are not open to the public.  There are still several family farms in the area.

Blackdown also has a village hall, built on ground owned by the Pinney family of Racedown House. It was initially called Blackdown Hut and officially opened on 9 December 1920 by Lady Rhodes Moorhouse but like the church it was a destroyed by a fire on the 8 September 1976 but was rebuilt and reopened exactly three years later. Blackdown W.I host their monthly meetings at the Hall, founded by Lady Hester Pinney in 1917 it is one of the earliest W.I's in Dorset.

The village lies at the foot of Blackdown Hill (215 m),  (not to be confused with the Blackdown Hills in Somerset), and is one of Dorset's high points from which there are extensive views of the local area. Although parts of Pilsdon Hill lie within the council ward of Blackdown the Iron Age hill fort itself lies within the parish of Pilsdon,  On the opposite side of Blackdown Hill near to the hamlet of Stoney Knapp and alongside Causeway Lane is the former congregational chapel of Venn with its churchyard and just around the corner is the particular baptist Ebenezer, both are now private houses, although Thorncombe tries to claim them, they are actually situated in the parish of Broadwindsor.

References

Villages in Dorset